Rear Admiral John Townshend, 4th Marquess Townshend (28 March 1798 – 10 September 1863), known as John Townshend until 1855, was a British nobleman, peer, politician, and naval commander.

Townshend was the son of Lord John Townshend, younger son of George Townshend, 1st Marquess Townshend. His mother was Georgiana Anne Poyntz. He served in the Royal Navy and achieved the rank of Rear-Admiral. Between 1847 and 1855 he also sat as a Member of Parliament (MP) for Tamworth. In the latter year he succeeded his first cousin in the marquessate and entered the House of Lords.

Lord Townshend married Elizabeth Jane Crichton-Stuart, daughter of Lord George Stuart, younger son of John Crichton-Stuart, 1st Marquess of Bute, on 18 August 1825. They had five children:

Lady Audrey Jane Charlotte Townshend (d. 1926), married firstly, Greville Howard, son of Charles Howard, 17th Earl of Suffolk and had issue. She married secondly, General Redvers Henry Buller.
James Dudley Browlow Stuart Townshend (d. 1846), unmarried
Anne Maria Townshend (d. 1899), married Alexander Sherson
Elizabeth Clementina Townshend (d. 1910), married John St Aubyn, 1st Baron St Levan and had issue
John Villiers Stuart Townshend, 5th Marquess Townshend (1831–1899)

Lord Townshend died in September 1863, aged 65, as result of a fall from his horse in the grounds of his home, Raynham Hall, and was buried at East Raynham, Norfolk. He was succeeded in his titles by his eldest son John. Lady Townshend died in 1877.

See also

References

Kidd, Charles, Williamson, David (editors). Debrett's Peerage and Baronetage (1990 edition). New York: St Martin's Press, 1990,

External links

Townshend, John Townshend, 4th Marquess
Townshend, John Townshend, 4th Marquess
18th-century English people
19th-century English nobility
04
Townshend, John Townshend, 4th Marquess
Members of the Parliament of the United Kingdom for English constituencies
UK MPs 1847–1852
UK MPs 1852–1857
UK MPs who inherited peerages
John Townshend
People from Raynham, Norfolk
Deaths by horse-riding accident in England